Jason Ross may refer to:
Jason Ross (comedian) (born 1968), Australian comedian and television presenter
Jason Ross (writer), American writer
Jason Ross (broadcaster), American broadcaster
Jason Ross (musician) (born 1989), American electronic music producer and DJ
Jason Ross (politician), congressional candidate for Texas's 4th congressional district